Buffalo West Wing is a book written by Julie Hyzy and published by Berkley Books (an imprint of Penguin Random House) on 4 January 2011, which later went on to win the Anthony Award for Best Paperback Original in 2012.

References 

Anthony Award-winning works
American mystery novels
2011 American novels
Berkley Books books